The Aero-Flight Aircraft Corporation was founded by ex-Curtiss-Wright employee James Nagamatsu at Buffalo, New York, U.S. in 1946 to produce a two-seat light aircraft, the Streak. However, due to the post-war saturation of the light aircraft market, the company was unable to generate any interest in the product and ceased business in 1953

References
 Taylor, J. H. (ed) (1989) Jane's Encyclopedia of Aviation. Studio Editions: London. p. 28
 Aerofiles

Defunct aircraft manufacturers of the United States
Companies based in New York (state)
Defunct companies based in New York (state)